Jordan Mark Witzigreuter (born November 14, 1989), known professionally as The Ready Set, is an American singer-songwriter from Fort Wayne, Indiana, United States. He is the lead vocalist and sole member of the act, using a backup band while on tour. He has released five studio albums, Syntax and Bright Lights, Tantrum Castle, I'm Alive, I'm Dreaming, The Bad & the Better, and I Will Be Nothing Without Your Love, eight extended plays and fourteen singles. He is best known for the commercially successful single "Love Like Woe" from his major label debut, I'm Alive, I'm Dreaming.

From 2019 to 2022, Witzigreuter briefly released music under the name Onlychild. He has released twelve singles and a four-track EP, Solstice under this name.

Witzigreuter is also a part of the synthpop band Nekokat, alongside Cameron Walker, and Jess Bowen of the Summer Set.

In 2021, in collaboration with Walker, Witzigreuter created the music label Swim Team Records. The company has featured a multitude of artists such as Future Coyote, TALKBAK, and Casey Abrams. The label's music has been featured in promotion for things such as the PGA Tour.

Early life
Witzigreuter was born and raised in Fort Wayne, Indiana, a location he frequently mentions in his music. At the age of 11, his mother signed him up for drum lessons. This led to him playing the drums in bands throughout middle school and high school. After becoming acquainted with other instruments, he began touring with bands at the age of 16. As a seventeen-year-old, Witzigreuter participated in various bands playing drums for the ska band Take Sides and the hardcore band Saints Never Surrender. Witzigreuter was credited on Saints Never Surrender's sophomore album, Brutus, which was released in 2008. He was also in the acoustic band brideandgroom.

Career

2007–09: Syntax and Bright Lights and Tantrum Castle
In 2007, Witzigreuter began making music independently under the name the Ready Set. His first two albums Syntax and Bright Lights and Tantrum Castle were recorded in the basement of his childhood home. Initially uploading his music to the once popular Myspace, Witzigreuter then began performing his music live. His first performances took place at The Mocha Lounge in Fort Wayne, Indiana, a coffee shop where he worked. His performances evolved to that of a live band, and he began performing for music festivals. These included The Bamboozle and Bamboozle Left, the Bamboozle Roadshow, and the MTV VMA Tour. He also opened for bands like Boys Like Girls and Never Shout Never.

The Ready Set has also made performances on MTV on multiple occasions, including an appearance on MTV's TJ Search Live Finale and being the "One to Watch" on MTV's 10 on Top. Witzigreuter has also been featured twice on MTV's Buzzworthy.

2010–11: I’m Alive, I’m Dreaming
 

Pete Wentz signed Witzigreuter to his label Decaydance Records in 2009. His first single, "Love Like Woe" peaked at number 27 on the Billboard Hot 100. The song lasted 21 weeks on chart and is certified platinum by RIAA. It also peaked at number 30 on the Canada CHR/Top 40 chart. His second single, "More Than Alive" was released on May 25, 2010. He released his first labelled album, I'm Alive, I'm Dreaming on June 9, 2010. The album peaked at number 3 on the Top Heatseekers albums chart lasting 23 weeks and peaked at number 172 on the Billboard Current Album Sales chart.

On November 2010, his single, "Love Like Woe" was one of the recipients for the BDS Spin Awards after receiving 50,000 spins. On November 26, 2010, he released a Christmas EP, Regifted and the song "Wishlist" peaked at number 32 on the Billboard Holiday Digital Song Sales chart. In 2011, he embarked on his first headlining tour called, "The Glamour Kills Tour". His third EP, Feel Good Now was released on October 7, 2011 and peaked at number 179 on the Billboard 200. The lead single, "Young Forever" peaked at number 39 on the US Mainstream Top 40 chart and at number 5 on the Bubbling Under Hot 100 chart. The release of the song was followed by two more single releases, "Hollywood Dream" and "Killer". In 2012, Witzigreuter was featured in an episode of Disney Channel's So Random!.

2012–15: The Bad & The Better

After leaving Decaydance following his third album, he subsequently signed with the label Razor & Tie, releasing The Bad & The Better which peaked at number 75 on the Billboard 200. He released his first single from the album "Give Me Your Hand (Best Song Ever)" in 2012 which peaked at number 30 on the US Mainstream Top 40 and number 33 on the New Zealand Top 40. "Higher", "Freakin Me Out", and "Fangz" were other singles released from the album. He served as an act on Warped Tour in 2014. He headlined a tour with Metro Station called, "The Outsiders Tour" with supporting acts, the Downtown Fiction and Against the Current. In 2015, Witzigreuter started a side project band Nekokat with artist Cameron Walker-Wright and drummer Jess Bowen from The Summer Set.

2016–18: I Will Be Nothing Without Your Love and V1 & V2
In 2016, Witzigreuter signed with Hopeless Records and released I Will Be Nothing Without Your Love that same year. The album peaked at number 24 on the Independent Albums Chart. He released two singles from the album, "Good Enough" and "Disappearing Act". He collaborated with Haitian DJ Michael Brun and made a remix to the song "Good Enough". The remix peaked at number 40 on the Dance/Mix Show Airplay chart. Witzigreuter stated in a 2016 interview with the Alternative Press that he almost ended the Ready Set following the release of his album, The Bad & The Better.

He started to release music independently in 2018 again with two extended plays: V1 and V2. "Life In Pink" was released on February 15, 2018. He released another single, "Stitch" on July 27, 2018. V3 was originally supposed to be released in October 2018 but the EP was never released. During that time the Ready Set collaborated with multiple other artists.

2019–2022: Onlychild
In mid-2019, Witzigreuter adopted a new name, Onlychild. He released his first EP Solstice under that name on July 27, 2019. In 2020, he released a non-album single "Chardonnay and Tangerine" in May. On October 23, 2020, Witzigreuter released another single "Thank Me Later". On April 16, 2021, he released his new single "Sad Fantasy" which featured Panic! at the Disco guitarist, Mike Naran.

In 2021, Witzigreuter and Nekokat collaborator Cameron Walker contributed writing credits to the single "Rock with You" on South Korean band Seventeen's mini-album Attacca.

Witzigreuter revived the Ready Set name in 2022 at the So What Music Festival and will perform under that name at the 2022 When We Were Young Festival.

Touring members

The Ready Set

Final touring members
 Cameron Walker – guitar, backing vocals
 Travis Rountree – drums, percussion
 Matthew Shaughn – bass guitar

Former touring members
 Mike Naran – guitar, backing vocals
 Deryck Stanek – guitar, backing vocals
 Keegan Weckler – guitar
 Andy Snyder – bass guitar

Onlychild

Current touring members
 Mike Naran – guitar, backing vocals
 Jess Bowen – drums, percussion

Personal life
Witzigreuter married his longtime girlfriend Katelyn Gentry in late 2017. Witzigreuter has a brother who is also a musician.

Discography

The Ready Set
 Syntax & Bright Lights (2008)
 Tantrum Castle (2009)
 I'm Alive, I'm Dreaming (2010)
 The Bad & the Better (2014)
 I Will Be Nothing Without Your Love (2016)

Nekokat

Onlychild
 Solstice EP (2019)

Awards and nominations

BDS Spin Awards

PETA's Libby Awards

Filmography

Tours

Headlining
 Glamour Kills Tour (2011)
 Blast From the Past Tour (2017)

Co-headlining
 Blackout Forever Tour  (2012)
 The Ready Set/Outasight Tour  (2013)
 The Outsiders Tour  (2014)

Opening act
Fight For Something Tour  (2016)

Festivals
Warped Tour (2011), (2014), (2015)
Rose Rock Tour (2017)
Fall Fest Tour (2017)
So What Music Festival (2022)
When We Were Young Festival (2022)

References

External links

The Ready Set – official website

American electronic musicians
Living people
1989 births
Musicians from Fort Wayne, Indiana
Decaydance Records artists
Sire Records artists
Hopeless Records artists
Razor & Tie artists
Reprise Records artists
Warner Records artists